Nanasaheb Bonde (1914-2000) was an Indian politician, elected to the Lok Sabha, the lower house of the Parliament of India as a member of the Indian National Congress.

References

External links
Official biographical sketch in Parliament of India website

India MPs 1977–1979
Lok Sabha members from Maharashtra
1914 births
Indian National Congress politicians
2000 deaths